Seaview Downs is a suburb of Adelaide in the City of Marion. The southern part of the suburb contains the O'Halloran Hill Recreation Park.

References

See also
List of Adelaide suburbs

Suburbs of Adelaide